Tuszynek Majoracki  is a village in the administrative district of Gmina Tuszyn, within Łódź East County, Łódź Voivodeship, in central Poland.

Climate
Tuszynek Majoracki has a humid continental climate (Cfb in the Köppen climate classification).

<div style="width:70%;">

References

Tuszynek Majoracki